Lance Charles McClain, known as  in the original Japanese language Beast King GoLion, is a fictional character in the media franchise Voltron and a member of the Voltron Force, who made his first appearance in Voltron: Defender of the Universe.

Voltron: Defender of the Universe

Lance was part of an exploratory team, sent by the Galaxy Alliance and led by Keith, that were kidnapped by the forces of Planet Doom.

After he and the others escaped Planet Doom, went to the Castle of Lions on Planet Arus, where they met Princess Allura and Coran and were designated as the Voltron Force.

Voltron Force

Lance is a flight instructor in the Galaxy Garrison flight Academy. He uses Daniel and Vince to steal the Lion keys from Sky Marshall Wade. Lance's weapons are heat fists and dual pistols.

Voltron: Legendary Defender
In Voltron: Legendary Defender, Lance is the paladin of the blue lion, one of five lions that make up Voltron, he is of Cuban descent, a rival to the Red Paladin Kieth, and the love interest of Princess Allura. He evolves and matures as a character. Lance is Joaquim Dos Santos' favorite character.

Comics

In the 2011 Devil's Due comics, the Lance character is referred to as Lance Charles McClain. The comic book version of Lance depicts him as 24 with a criminal record. For most of his life, Lance grew up as an adolescent daredevil and drag-racer. His life changed forever when he won a gift certificate for 10 free flying lessons in a radio contest. These lessons displayed that he had a natural talent for flying. At age 18, he joined the navy, and flying became his obsession, but his hot-headedness landed him in deep water when his jetstar buzzed the penthouse of a vindictive senator. Three months into his five-year sentence in a military prison, Lance was approached by Colonel Hawkins to join a team of outcasts to search for the legendary robot Voltron on the distant planet Arus. The comic book version of Lance is given the catchphrase of exclaiming "holy cats!", or sometimes "ho-leeee cats!".

Reception
The character has had a mostly positive reception.

References

Television characters introduced in 1984
Fictional Cuban people
Fictional martial arts trainers
Voltron
Fictional military personnel